Tiberio Ugolino was a thrice appointed Bishop of Down and Connor who held the post, firstly, in 1483 and, finally, in 1519.

Notes

15th-century Roman Catholic bishops in Ireland
Bishops of Down and Connor
16th-century Irish bishops